Charlton, in full Charlton St Peter, is a small village and civil parish in the Vale of Pewsey in the English county of Wiltshire.

The village is in the north of the parish, between the River Avon and the Devizes-Upavon road, the A342. To the south the parish extends onto Salisbury Plain.

Parish church 
The Church of England parish church of St Peter was largely rebuilt by J.L. Pearson in 1858. Fragments of a 12-century building survive, and the tower is from the 15th or 16th centuries. The north chantry chapel, c. 1523, is in memory of William and Marion Chaucey. In 1964 the church was designated as Grade II* listed.

The first record of a vicar at Charlton is from 1306, and by that time the church had been appropriated by the nearby Upavon Priory; in 1423 Upavon and Charlton were granted to the Augustinian canons of Ivychurch Priory, southeast of Salisbury, who held them until the Dissolution. Today the parish is served by the Vale of Pewsey team ministry.

Local government

Charlton shares a parish council, named Charlton St Peter and Wilsford, with the adjacent parish of Wilsford. Charlton elects five councillors to sit alongside two from Wilsford. The parish is in the area of Wiltshire Council, a unitary authority which is responsible for most local government functions.

Traditions

The village inn is the Charlton Cat, "a solitary little inn at the foot of the downs". This establishment was originally called the Red Lion, later the Poores Arms after Edward Poore, lord of the nearby manor of Rushall in the eighteenth century, but the villagers had long known it as The Cat, from the ill-painted lion of the original sign. This name was formally adopted in 1921.

Charlton and the neighbouring village of Rushall hold an annual village cricket match each year in June. It used to be played in each village alternately, but in recent years since the Village Lunch has been established in Rushall Village Hall, the match has been played in a field behind the Old Barns. In the last few years a tug-of-war competition has been started, only seriously between the men for the trophy, but there are a women's and children's tug-of-war as well.

Notable people
Stephen Duck, 18th-century poet, was born here and the grave of his wife Mary is in the churchyard.  The "Duck Feast", held annually at the Charlton Cat in the first week of June, commemorates his life and work. The cost is met from the rent of "Duck's Acre", a field in Rushall donated for the purpose by Lord Palmerston.

References

Further reading

External links

Villages in Wiltshire
Civil parishes in Wiltshire